The hiatus for the greater petrosal nerve is a small hole in the petrous part of the temporal bone which connects the facial canal to the middle cranial fossa. The greater petrosal nerve travels through it to branch from the facial nerve and reach the middle cranial fossa on its way to the pterygopalatine ganglion.

Foramina of the skull